Clarkometra elegans is a species of feather star, a type of crinoid, in the family Colobometridae. It is found from South West Mindanao in the Philippines to the Bonin Islands, Japan. It occurs at a depth ranging from 72 to 80 m.

References

External links 
 Clarkometra elegans at the World Register of Marine Species (WoRMS)

Colobometridae
Animals described in 1922